The Yasnaya Polyana Literary Award is an annual all-Russian literary award that was founded in 2003 by the Leo Tolstoy Museum Estate and Samsung Electronics. The award is presented for the best traditional-style novel written in Russian or translated into Russian.

The Yasnaya Polyana literary award maintains classical literature traditions by commemorating the authors of outstanding works and also supports contemporary literary works by noting talented writers. These two aspects allow the award to remain balanced and harmonious.

Background
Originally, till 2005, there were two categories: An Outstanding Work of Russian Fiction and An Outstanding Debut in Russian Fiction, renamed into Contemporary Classic and  21st Century, respectively. In 2012 (the award's 10-year anniversary), another nomination category was added to the award – Childhood, Boyhood, Youth, named after Leo Tolstoy's semi-autobiographical trilogy of novels.

The fourth category, Foreign Fiction, was added in 2015, and the fifth, Readers' Choice, in 2016. In 2017, Contemporary Classic was renamed into Contemporary Russian Fiction, Event category added; Childhood, Boyhood, Youth and 21st Century abandoned. Since then, the categories are as follows: 
 Contemporary Russian Fiction
 Foreign Fiction
 Event in arts, entertainment, and media
 Readers' Choice

The award's fund doubled since 2010. Currently, it amounts to 6.7 million RUB. The winner of the Contemporary Russian Fiction award receives 3 million roubles; 1.2 million roubles go to the Foreign Fiction laureate, while its translator gets 500 thousand, and 500 thousand roubles receives the winner in Event category. 1 million RUB is divided between the Contemporary Russian Fiction finalists. The Readers' Choice winner is awarded with a theme trip to South Korea, presented by Samsung. All winners receive a special statuette.

The jury
The jury, which consists of famous writers, critics and literature experts, select authors whose works preserve the traditions of classic literature and, at the same time, represent the relevant trends of modern Russian and foreign literature.

Yasnaya Polyana jury members include famous Russian writers, literary critics and public figures. At present (2020) there are:
 Vladimir Tolstoy– chairman of the jury, advisor to the President of the Russian Federation on cultural matters, journalist;
 Pavel Basinsky – journalist, writer, literary critic;
 Aleksey Varlamov – novelist, scholar of 20th-century Russian literature;
 Eugene Vodolazkin – literary critic, writer, winner of the Yasnaya Polyana literary award;
 Valentin Kurbatov – writer, essayist, literary critic;
 Vladislav Otroshenko – Russian writer and essayist, winner of the Yasnaya Polyana literary award.

Winners

2003 — 2005

2006 — 2011

2012 — 2014

2015 — 2016

Since 2017

See also 

 Winners of Yasnaya Polyana Literary Award were announced // Gazeta.ru // 21.10.2014 
 Medinsky has criticized the school literature programm //Lenta.ru// 21.10.2014 
 Winners of Yasnaya Polyana Literary Award were announced // Vedomosti.ru// 22.10.2014
 The trilogy about the First World War won in Yasnaya Polyana Literary Award // Rg.ru// 22.10.2014

References

External links
Yppremia.ru
Ypmuseum.ru

Awards established in 2003
Russian literary awards
Russian-language literary awards